Bliss House may refer to:

in Lebanon
Bliss House, a restaurant on Bliss Street, or Rue Bliss, in the Hamra area, within the Ras Beirut District of Beirut

in the United States
Bliss House (Denver, Colorado), also known as "Building at 1389 Stuart Street", listed on the National Register of Historic Places (NRHP) in West Denver
F. T. Bliss House, Emmett, Idaho, NRHP-listed in Gem County
Bagley-Bliss House, now the Bliss Farm Inn, in Durham, Maine, NRHP-listed
Abiah Bliss House, Rehoboth, Massachusetts, NRHP-listed
Daniel Bliss Homestead, Rehoboth, Massachusetts, NRHP-listed
L. Bliss House, Westfield, Chautauqua County, New York, NRHP-listed
Phillip Paul Bliss House, Rome, Bradford County, Pennsylvania, now the Philip P. Bliss Gospel Songwriters Museum
John Bliss House, Newport, Rhode Island, NRHP-listed
Dumbarton Oaks, research institute and former residence of Richard and Mildred Bliss in Georgetown neighborhood of Washington, D.C.

See also
Bliss Building, Worcester, Massachusetts, NRHP-listed